Dmitry Shavrov (born 18 September 1983), better known by his stage names Sasha Song or Sasha Son, is a Lithuanian singer and songwriter. He represented Lithuania in the Eurovision Song Contest 2009. His stage name Sasha Son means "Sasha Dream" in Russian, with Sasha being a Russian diminutive form of the name Alexander.

Biography

Early life
At 12 years old, Dima Šavrovas was debuted in the music scene of Lithuania. He is a Russian-Lithuanian. His major hit to date is Mama. He currently is the youngest person to have won the "Bravo" music award for the song of the year with his song Mama. At the age of 15 he moved to the  United Kingdom; he completed secondary education there and acquired musical education.

Professional life
He represented Lithuania at the Eurovision Song Contest 2009 in the second Semi-Final and advanced to the Final where he finished in 23rd place. Dmitry has earlier worked with Eurovision Song Contest 2008 winner Dima Bilan. At Eurovision pre-selection final he received full points from all the juries. He participated again in Lithuania's national selection for Eurovision 2010 along with Nora with the song "Say Yes to Life."

See also
Lithuania in the Eurovision Song Contest 2009

References

External links

1983 births
Living people
Eurovision Song Contest entrants of 2009
Eurovision Song Contest entrants for Lithuania
Lithuanian people of Russian descent
Lithuanian pop singers
Musicians from Vilnius
English-language singers from Lithuania